Tyler Perry Studios (TPS) is an American film production studio in Atlanta, Georgia founded by actor, filmmaker, and playwright Tyler Perry in 2006.

In 2019, Perry celebrated the grand opening of his newest Atlanta studio location, having purchased  of the former Fort McPherson complex in 2015 to make it the new home of Tyler Perry Studios. Tyler Perry Studios is the largest film production studio in the United States, and established Perry as the first African-American to outright own a major film production studio. Through 34th Street Films, a production arm of Tyler Perry Studios, Perry guides the work of other filmmakers.

In 2018, Perry sold his previous studio location opened in 2008 to another minority-owned film production company. The previous studio location occupied two former Delta Air Lines affiliated buildings in the Greenbriar area of southwest Atlanta, and included  of sets and office space.

Tyler Perry Studios is a notable resource for Atlanta's robust economy. The company often advertises for film and crew positions at its southwest Atlanta location.

History
Perry has full ownership of his films, and Lions Gate Entertainment used to serve as his distributor for all of his films starting from Diary of a Mad Black Woman to A Madea Family Funeral. After signing his deal with ViacomCBS, Mr. Perry's films are now distributed by Paramount Pictures and Netflix starting with Nobody's Fool and A Fall from Grace.  His first film, Diary of a Mad Black Woman, produced on a budget of $5.5 million, became an unexpected commercial success prompting widespread discussion among industry watchers about whether middle-class African-Americans were simply not being addressed by mainstream Hollywood movies. Its final gross box office receipts were $50.6 million, although it was critically panned scoring only 16 percent approval rating on the website Rotten Tomatoes. On its opening weekend, February 24, 2006, Perry's film version of Madea's Family Reunion opened at No. 1 with $30.3 million. The film eventually grossed $65 million and, like Diary, almost all of it in the United States. The film was jump-started by an hour-long appearance by Perry and his co-stars on the daily talk show The Oprah Winfrey Show.

His next project for Lionsgate, Daddy's Little Girls, starring British actor Idris Elba and Gabrielle Union was released in the U.S. on February 14, 2007. It grossed over $31 million.  Perry wrote, directed, produced and starred in his next film, Why Did I Get Married?, which was released on October 12, 2007. It opened as the top-grossing movie in its first weekend, earning $21.4 million at the box office. It is loosely based on the play which Perry wrote in 2004. Filming began March 5, 2007, in Whistler, British Columbia, Vancouver, then Atlanta, where Perry opened his own studio.  Janet Jackson, Sharon Leal, Jill Scott, and Tasha Smith appear in the film. Perry's 2008 film, Meet the Browns, which was released on March 21, opened at No. 2 with a $20,082,809 weekend gross. The Family That Preys opened on September 12, 2008, and grossed over $35.1 million as of October. Madea Goes to Jail opened at No. 1 on February 20, 2009, grossing $41 million and becoming his largest opening to date. This was Perry's seventh film with Lionsgate.

On May 1, 2012, a four-alarm fire engulfed portions of the studio complex, causing the partial collapse of one building. Less than three months later, another fire broke out on the roof of another building on the morning of August 27, 2012. On November 20, 2019, it hosted the MSNBC and Washington Post 2020 Democratic Party presidential debate on the Oprah Winfrey sound stage. It also hosted Miss Universe 2019 on December 8.

In June 2021, Tyler Perry and T.D. Jakes announced they were purchasing over 130 acres in Atlanta including a proposed expansion of Tyler Perry Studios for an entertainment district with theaters, retail shops, restaurants, and a Georgia film and TV museum.  Perry is expecting the entertainment district to be completed in 2025.

Studio locations
Before moving to its first southwest Atlanta location in 2008, the studios used the former studio space at 99 Krog Street in Inman Park on the BeltLine in central Atlanta. Perry had purchased the land from Atlanta Stage Works in 2006 for a reported $7 million. The studios were later converted into the Krog Street Market.

In 2019, Tyler Perry Studios officially moved into  of the former Fort McPherson complex in southwest Atlanta. It has a residential neighborhood cul-de-sac with 12 homes, many of them with actual functioning interiors...furnished and decorated, not simply "facades." It also hosts 12 soundstages named after highly accomplished African-Americans in the entertainment industry.

Sets
Airplane
Bank
Baseball Fields
Chapel
County Jail
Modern Courtroom
Courtroom
Coffee Shop
Culdesac
Classic Diner
Farmhouse
Historic District
Lakeside Cabin
Luxury Hotel
Mansion
Maxineville
Motel
Post Theatre
Prison Yard
Rustic Cabin
Tennis Court
Theatre
Trailer Park
White House
The Dream Building
Greenspace

Some production history

Film

Zombieland: Double Tap (2019)
Coming 2 America (2021)
Red Notice (2021)
A Madea Homecoming (2022)
A Jazzman's Blues (2022)
Black Panther: Wakanda Forever (2022)
Blade (2024)

Television
The Haves and the Have Nots (2013–2021)
Divorce Court (2018–present)
Sistas (2019–present)
The Oval (2019–present)
Assisted Living (2020-present)
Bruh (2020-present)
House of Payne (2020-present)
Ruthless (2020–present)
Young Dylan (2020–present)
All the Queen's Men (2021–present)
Hawkeye (2021)

References

External links

American companies established in 2006
Companies based in Atlanta
Film production companies of the United States
Television production companies of the United States
Mass media companies established in 2006
2006 establishments in Georgia (U.S. state)
Lionsgate
Tyler Perry